KGND is a radio station airing a sports format licensed to Vinita, Oklahoma, broadcasting on 1470 kHz AM.  The station is owned by KXOJ, INC.

History
KGND (K-Grand) was originally a 50,000 watt FM radio station built and owned by Jack D. Lee of Vinita, Oklahoma. It was licensed out of Ketchum, Oklahoma on FM frequency 107.5 and went live on air for the first time at 5:00am on May 25, 1989, broadcasting from studios in Vinita, Oklahoma. KGND started with an adult contemporary format and eventually changed to a unique and one-of-a-kind format known as Lake Rock. In 1998, Jack sold K-Grand to Grove, Oklahoma radio station owner Larry Hestand. Larry operated K-Grand until he sold it in 2004 to Oklahoma State University and KGND was changed to KOSU, a public radio station.

Translators

References

External links

Sports radio stations in the United States
GND